Veranika Ivanova (born 24 September 1996) is a Belarusian freestyle wrestler. She is a two-time bronze medalist at the European Wrestling Championships. She is also a bronze medalist at the European Games.

Career 

She represented Belarus at the 2015 European Games held in Baku, Azerbaijan and she won one of the bronze medals in the women's freestyle 60 kg event. She also competed in the women's freestyle 62 kg event at the 2019 European Games in Minsk, Belarus without winning a medal. She was eliminated in her first match by Johanna Mattsson of Sweden.

In 2016, she won one of the bronze medals in the women's 63 kg event at the World University Wrestling Championships held in Çorum, Turkey.

In 2017, she competed in the women's freestyle 63 kg event at the European Wrestling Championships held in Novi Sad, Serbia. She was eliminated in her first match by Yuliya Tkach of Ukraine. In 2018, at the European Wrestling Championships held in Kaspiysk, Dagestan, Russia, she won one of the bronze medals in the women's freestyle 62 kg event. She also won one of the bronze medals in the same event at the 2021 European Wrestling Championships in Warsaw, Poland. Two weeks later, she failed to qualify for the 2020 Summer Olympics at the World Olympic Qualification Tournament held in Sofia, Bulgaria. In October 2021, she competed in the 62 kg event at the World Wrestling Championships held in Oslo, Norway.

In 2022, she lost her bronze medal match in her event at the Yasar Dogu Tournament held in Istanbul, Turkey.

Achievements

References

External links 

 

Living people
1996 births
Place of birth missing (living people)
Belarusian female sport wrestlers
European Games bronze medalists for Belarus
European Games medalists in wrestling
Wrestlers at the 2015 European Games
Wrestlers at the 2019 European Games
European Wrestling Championships medalists
21st-century Belarusian women